Orient Securities Co., Ltd. also known as DFZQ is a Chinese investment bank and brokerage firm headquartered in Shanghai. Orient Securities is a constituent of SSE 50 Index, the blue chip index of Shanghai Stock Exchange.

It provided services in securities, futures, asset management, wealth management, investment banking, investment advisory, and securities research. It was successfully listed on the Shanghai Stock Exchange on 23 March 2015 and on the Hong Kong Stock Exchange in 2016.

Joint Ventures
 Citi Orient Securities

See also 
 Securities industry in China

References

External links 
 

Companies listed on the Shanghai Stock Exchange
Companies in the CSI 100 Index
Companies listed on the Hong Kong Stock Exchange
H shares
Financial services companies of China
Investment banks in China
Investment management companies of China
Government-owned companies of China
Chinese companies established in 1998
Financial services companies established in 1998
Banks established in 1998
Companies based in Shanghai